Cho Min-hyeok (born 17 January 1987) is a South Korean tennis player.

Cho has a career high ATP singles ranking of 536 achieved on 22 August 2016 and a career high ATP doubles ranking of 820, achieved on 3 November 2014. Cho has won two ITF singles titles and two ITF doubles titles.

Cho has represented South Korea at the Davis Cup, where he has a win–loss record of 2–4.

External links

1987 births
Living people
South Korean male tennis players
Tennis players from Seoul
Tennis players at the 2014 Asian Games
Asian Games competitors for South Korea
21st-century South Korean people